Jimi Mistry (born 1 January 1973) is a retired English actor. He is known for appearing in numerous films such as East Is East (1999), The Guru (2002), Ella Enchanted (2004), The Truth About Love (2005), Blood Diamond (2006), Partition (2007), RocknRolla (2008), Exam (2009), It's a Wonderful Afterlife (2010), and West is West (2010). He is also known for his roles, as Dr. Fred Fonseca in BBC1 soap opera EastEnders, Latif in Cinemax series Strike Back, Kal Nazir in long-running ITV soap opera Coronation Street, and as Tom Bedford in Kay Mellor drama The Syndicate.

Early life and education 
Mistry was born on 1 January 1973 in Scarborough, North Riding of Yorkshire, to a father of Indian descent and an Irish mother. He attended St James' Catholic High School in Cheadle Hulme (1985–1988) before his family moved to Cardiff where he attended Radyr Comprehensive School. Mistry trained at the Birmingham School of Speech and Drama.

Career 
Mistry first gained exposure playing Dr. Fred Fonseca on BBC TV's EastEnders, and has since worked on film and stage.

His work includes starring roles in East Is East, The Guru with Heather Graham and Marisa Tomei, Blood Diamond opposite Leonardo DiCaprio, Guy Ritchie's RocknRolla and Partition with Kristin Kreuk. He can be seen in the BAFTA-nominated movie Exam, and also portrayed Satnam Tsurutani in the epic disaster film 2012.

In 2010, Mistry appeared in Gurinder Chadha's film It's a Wonderful Afterlife which premiered at the 2010 Sundance film festival; Basement, a horror film with Danny Dyer; and West is West, the sequel to East is East. Mistry has also produced, written and starred in a music documentary about Ibiza entitled And The Beat Goes On, exploring the history of the island, the birth of House Music and the art of the DJ. DJs involved in the film include Paul Oakenfold, Danny Rampling, Nicky Holloway, David Guetta, Brandon Block, Alfredo, Pete Tong and Danny Tenaglia. Mistry, himself, regularly DJs in clubs across UK and Europe. He also runs and DJ"s London"s hippest "mystery" location party scene called Tabula Rasa, as well as having his own record label and studio. Mistry has also appeared in television series such as Nearly Famous and the second series of The Syndicate.

Mistry joined the soap Coronation Street in November 2013 as Khalid Nazir, a fitness coach and former soldier.

Strictly Come Dancing 

In 2010, Mistry competed in the eighth series of BBC One's Strictly Come Dancing, partnered with Flavia Cacace. The couple were eliminated after week 6.

Personal life 
Mistry lived with Meg Leonard from 1993; they married in 2001 and divorced in March 2010. They have one daughter, Elin Leonard Mistry (born 13 May 2001). He resides in Devon with his wife, dancer Flavia Cacace, his professional dance partner on Strictly Come Dancing in 2010. The couple married in December 2013.

Filmography

Film

Television

References

External links 
 

1973 births
Living people
20th-century English male actors
21st-century English male actors
Actors from Scarborough, North Yorkshire
Alumni of Birmingham School of Acting
British people of Indian descent
British people of Irish descent
English male film actors
English male soap opera actors
English male television actors
English people of Indian descent
English people of Irish descent
Male actors from Yorkshire
People educated at Radyr Comprehensive School
People from Crouch End